Carl Morris may refer to:

Carl Morris (painter) (1911–1993), American painter
Carl E. Morris (1887–1951), American boxer
Carl Morris (statistician), professor of statistics at Harvard University
Carl Morris, a fictional character in the British TV series, Moving Wallpaper